Tô Văn Vũ (born 20 October 1993) is a Vietnamese professional footballer who plays as a midfielder for V.League 1 club Công An Hà Nội.

Career
At the age of 20, Tô joined the youth academy of Vietnamese lower league side Đồng Nai, his first team.

For the 2017 season, he signed for Becamex Binh Duong in the Vietnamese top flight.

Honours
Becamex Bình Dương
Vietnamese National Cup: 2018; Runner-up 2017
Vietnamese Super Cup: Runner-up 2019

References

External links

Vietnamese footballers
Living people
1993 births
Association football midfielders